Lane Bradford (born John Myrtland Le Varre, Jr., August 29, 1922 – June 6, 1973) was an American actor, who appeared in more than 250 films and television series between 1940 and 1973, specializing in supporting "tough-guy" roles predominantly in Westerns but also in more contemporary crime dramas such as Dragnet, The Fugitive, and Hawaii Five-O.

Early life 
Lane Bradford was born in 1923, the son of John Merton.

Career 
Bradford appeared in many television series and "B" western films. On stage, he co-starred in Desperadoes' Outpost (1952), The Great Sioux Uprising (1953, and Apache Warrior (1957).

Bradford played the historical figure, Sequoyah, the namesake of Sequoia National Park, in the 1954 episode "Sequoia" of the western anthology series Death Valley Days hosted by Stanley Andrews. The segment covers Sequoyah from earliest years to his development of the Cherokee alphabet. Carol Thurston and Angie Dickinson played Sali and Ayoka, respectively. In ak 1959 Death Valley Days episode, "The Blonde King," Bradford played California pioneer Jim Savage, a friend of the Indians who works to stop a threat to the peace of the Yosemite Valley.

In the 1950s, 1960s, and early 1970s, Bradford guest-starred on nearly all of the Western series broadcast on American television during that period.  He was cast on the ABC/Warner Brothers series, Colt .45 as Pete Jesup in the 1959 episode "The Devil's Godson". He also appeared on Hopalong Cassidy, The Lone Ranger (fifteen times), Buffalo Bill, Jr. (six times), Laredo (five times), The Cisco Kid, Tales of the Texas Rangers (twice), Jefferson Drum,  Johnny Ringo, Maverick, The Adventures of Rin Tin Tin (five times), Lassie (TV series) (1965), The Life and Legend of Wyatt Earp (six times), Cheyenne (seven times), Wagon Train (eight times), The High Chaparral (twice), The Restless Gun (four times), times), Bat Masterson, Bonanza (fourteen times), Gunsmoke (thirteen times), The Travels of Jaimie McPheeters, Storefront Lawyers,  Ripcord, and Sergeant Preston of the Yukon.

Bradford guest-starred on the religion anthology series, Crossroads. He made two appearances on CBS's Perry Mason, including the role of Detective Arnold Buck in the 1962 episode "The Case of the Absent Artist."

His last television appearance was in 1973 on an episode of the CBS private-detective series Cannon, with William Conrad.  The episode, titled "Press Pass to the Slammer", aired that year on March 13, just three months before Bradford's death.

 Death 
In early June 1973, Bradford collapsed while boating in Hawaii. Rushed to Kaiser Memorial Hospital in Honolulu, the 50-year-old actor died at that facility four days later of a cerebral hemorrhage.  Although most biographical profiles of Bradford cite his death date as June 7, 1973, that date is actually incorrect.  His official death certificate, which was issued by Kaiser Memorial Hospital, documents that he died on June 6, 1973.  In accordance with Bradford's wishes, the Oahu Cemetery Association administered the cremation of his remains.

 Selected filmography 

1940: Frontier Crusader - Cowhand (uncredited)
1940: Riders of Black Mountain - Deputy (uncredited)
1946: Silver Range1946: Overland Riders1947: Prairie Raiders1947: Return of the Lash1947: Black Hills 
1947: Ghost Town Renegades1948: Dead Man's Gold1948: Check Your Guns1948: Adventures of Frank and Jesse James1949: Death Valley Gunfighter1949: Prince of the Plains 
1950: The Arizona Cowboy1951: Wanted: Dead or Alive1951: Oklahoma Justice1951: Wells Fargo Gunmaster1952: Man from the Black Hills1952: Texas City1952: Waco 
1953: Law and Order1953: Savage Frontier1953: Kansas Pacific1953-1956: Adventures of Superman (TV Series) - Al / Guree the Bear / Capt. Chris White
1954: Drums Across the River1955: Stranger on Horseback - Kettering Henchman (uncredited)
1955: Seven Angry Men - Ruffian on Train (uncredited)
1955: The Spoilers - Second Sourdough (uncredited)
1955-1959: Fury (NBC, TV Series) - Verne / Vern Bates / Bart - aka Verne Clancy
1956: The Conqueror - Chieftain #4 (uncredited)
1956: The Steel Jungle - Guard
1956: Red Sundown - Mike Zellman (uncredited)
1956: The Rawhide Years - River Pirate (uncredited)
1956: Gun Brothers - Deputy (uncredited)
1956: Showdown at Abilene - Loop
1957: The Phantom Stagecoach - Langton (uncredited)
1957: Shoot-Out at Medicine Bend - Stone (uncredited)
1957: Gun Glory - Ugly (uncredited)
1957: Apache Warrior - Sgt. Gaunt
1956-1957: Sergeant Preston of the Yukon (TV Series) - Bart Larson / Jason Bowhead / Big Ike Bancroft
1958: Richard Diamond, Private Detective (CBS-TV, Series) - Sol Noonan
1958: The Sheepman - Ranch Hand (uncredited)
1958: The Toughest Gun in Tombstone - Curly Bill Brosius
1958: The Lone Ranger and the Lost City of Gold - Wilson
1959: Have Gun - Will Travel - Frank Tanner
1959-1960: The Texan (CBS, TV Series, with Chill Wills) - Buck Tanner / Jed Burdette / Gabe Kiley / Spike Taylor
1959-1972: Gunsmoke (TV Series) - Dump Hart / Joe Eggers / Bradford / Reese / Dan O'Hare / Davis / Lige / Gant / Bob / Rawlins / Tush / Jay
1960: Bourbon Street Beat (ABC-TV, Series) - Bailey
1960: Bat Masterson (TV Series) - Rob Bradbury
1960: Tate (NBC-TV, with Robert Redford) - William Essey
1961: Sea Hunt (TV Series) - Capt. Jonathan Moss / Frank Judd
1963: The Gun Hawk - Joe Sully
1963: The Dakotas (ABC-TV Series) - Sergeant Abel Round
1964: A Distant Trumpet - Maj. Miller
1965: Shenandoah - Tatum (uncredited)
1965: The Slender Thread - Al McCardle
1965: Lassie (TV Series) - Sam
1966: Batman (ABC-TV Series) - Cordy Blue
1967: Rango (ABC-TV Series) - Cole Colton (Episode: "Shootout at Mesa Flats")
1967: Dragnet (NBC-TV Series) - Champ Ridgely
1968: Journey to Shiloh - Case Pettibone
1971: Shoot Out - Prison Warden (uncredited)
1971-1973: Hawaii Five-O (CBS-TV Series) - Manola / Moose Oakley
1973: Cannon (CBS-TV Series) - Walt Morgan

References

External links

1922 births
1973 deaths
American male television actors
American male film actors
20th-century American male actors
People from Yonkers, New York
People from Los Angeles